Cory Remekun (born July 15, 1991) is an American professional basketball player for the Lille Métropole of the Pro B. He played college basketball for Saint Louis.

External links
 Eurobasket.com profile
 FIBA profile
 Saint Louis Billikens bio

1991 births
Living people
African-American basketball players
American expatriate basketball people in Bosnia and Herzegovina
American expatriate basketball people in France
American expatriate basketball people in Germany
American expatriate basketball people in Greece
American expatriate basketball people in Slovenia
American men's basketball players
Basketball players from Texas
Centers (basketball)
HKK Široki players
Lille Métropole BC players
Mesquite High School (Texas) alumni
Nea Kifissia B.C. players
People from Mesquite, Texas
Power forwards (basketball)
Saint Louis Billikens men's basketball players
Sportspeople from the Dallas–Fort Worth metroplex
21st-century African-American sportspeople
Helios Suns players